V. M. Rajalakshmi is an Indian politician and a member of the 15th Tamil Nadu Legislative Assembly. She was elected from Sankarankoil constituency as a candidate of the AIADMK.

Jayalalithaa appointed V. M. Rajalakshmi as Minister for Adi Dravidar and Tribal Welfare in May 2016. This was her first cabinet post in the Government of Tamil Nadu.

References 

Year of birth missing (living people)
Living people
Tamil Nadu MLAs 2016–2021
State cabinet ministers of Tamil Nadu
All India Anna Dravida Munnetra Kazhagam politicians
21st-century Indian women politicians
Women members of the Tamil Nadu Legislative Assembly